Valery Nikolayevich Korolyov (born 1965, Leningrad) is a Soviet basketball. Centerline. Height -  212 cm

Career 
He played for the BC Spartak Leningrad, BC Budivelnyk (1990—1992), St. Pölten (Austria) (1994—1999, 2000–2003), Wienna (Austria) (1999—2000).

Soviet Union national team
Silver medalist at the 1990 World Cup.

Family
Married to Tatyana Gromyko, has a son Dmitry (born 1985).

References

External links 
 StatusPress
 11-й чемпионат мира

1965 births
Living people
BC Budivelnyk players
BC Spartak Saint Petersburg players
Centers (basketball)
Soviet men's basketball players
Basketball players from Saint Petersburg
1990 FIBA World Championship players